It's Your Move is the title of two short films written and directed by Eric Sykes (in 1969 and 1982 respectively).  The story of both films involves a married couple moving into a new home and enduring the ineptitude of removal men.  As with most other films directed by Sykes, the action unfolds in a style echoing the silent, slapstick comedy era.

Synopsis
A young married couple unwisely entrust an inept removals team with their move into a new home.

Cast
 Richard Briers as the husband
 Eric Sykes as head removal man
 Tommy Cooper as big removal man
 Bernard Cribbins as neighbour
 Jimmy Edwards as policeman
 Irene Handl as grand old lady
 Brian Murphy as chauffeur
 Noel Murphy as bearded removal man
 Andrew Sachs as roadsweeper
 Sylvia Syms as the wife
 Bob Todd as old removal man
 Johnny Vyvyan as little removal man

References

External links
 

1982 films
Films directed by Eric Sykes
British short films